John Gordon Gray (born August 13, 1949) is a retired professional ice hockey player who played 363 games in the World Hockey Association.  He played with the Phoenix Roadrunners, Houston Aeros, and Winnipeg Jets.

External links 

1949 births
Canadian ice hockey left wingers
New Hampshire Wildcats men's ice hockey players
Houston Aeros (WHA) players
Ice hockey people from Ontario
Living people
Phoenix Roadrunners (WHA) players
Winnipeg Jets (WHA) players
Canadian expatriate ice hockey players in the United States